Jenni Goodling and Wendy Wood were the defending champions but did not compete that year.

Ann Henricksson and Julie Richardson won in the final 6–3, 3–6, 7–5 against Lea Antonoplis and Cammy MacGregor.

Seeds
Champion seeds are indicated in bold text while text in italics indicates the round in which those seeds were eliminated.

 Lise Gregory /  Ronni Reis (semifinals)
 Lea Antonoplis /  Cammy MacGregor (final)
 Elly Hakami /  Gretchen Magers (quarterfinals)
 Camille Benjamin /  Wendy White (semifinals)

Draw

References
 1988 OTB Open Women's Doubles Draw

Women's Doubles
Doubles